The following is a list of notable deaths in April 2019.

Entries for each day are listed alphabetically by surname. A typical entry lists information in the following sequence:
 Name, age, country of citizenship at birth, subsequent country of citizenship (if applicable), reason for notability, cause of death (if known), and reference.

April 2019

1
Dixie Allen, 84, American politician, member of the Ohio House of Representatives (1998–2006).
Enrique Álvarez Conde, 67, Spanish academic (King Juan Carlos University), lung cancer.
Giacomo Battaglia, 54, Italian comedian, complications from a stroke.
Bill Butchart, 85, Australian Olympic middle-distance runner.
Sardar Fateh Buzdar, 79–80, Pakistani politician, member of the Provincial Assembly of the Punjab (1985–1988, 2002–2013).
Caravelli, 88, French conductor and composer (And Satan Calls the Turns).
Dimitar Dobrev, 87, Bulgarian wrestler, Olympic champion (1960).
Michael William Feast, 92, British-born South African astronomer.
Gustav Hanson, 84, American Olympic biathlete.
Sinethemba Jantjie, 30, South African footballer (Free State Stars), traffic collision.
Joan Jones, 79, American-born Canadian civil rights activist.
Francisco Massiani, 74, Venezuelan writer and painter.
Bucky McConnell, 90, American basketball player (Milwaukee Hawks).
Vonda N. McIntyre, 70, American science fiction author (Dreamsnake, The Crystal Star), pancreatic cancer.
Frank E. Moore, 85, American politician, member of the Pennsylvania House of Representatives (1969–1970).
Vladimir Orloff, 90, Romanian-Canadian cellist and music teacher.
Yisroel Avrohom Portugal, 95, American rabbi, Rebbe of Skulen (since 1982).
Ruth-Margret Pütz, 89, German coloratura soprano.
Rafael Sánchez Ferlosio, 91, Spanish writer, Cervantes Prize winner (2004).
Dilip Sarkar, 61, Indian politician, liver and kidney disease.
Ron Sweed, 70, American television host, heart attack.
Joseph Ubalde, 34, Filipino weatherman (AksyonTV), news producer (GMA News) and columnist (The Manila Times).
Vodka, 14, Japanese racehorse, laminitis.
S. Pierre Yameogo, 63, Burkinabé film director and screenwriter (Delwende).

2
Matoug Adam, 93, Libyan politician, Minister of Tourism (1968–1969) and Interior (1969).
Rovshan Almuradly, 64, Azerbaijani actor, director and screenwriter, heart attack.
Herman Braun-Vega, 85, Peruvian painter.
Rick Elias, 64, American musician (A Ragamuffin Band), brain cancer.
Kim English, 48, American house and gospel singer-songwriter, kidney failure.
Michael Fahy, 78, Irish politician, Galway County Councilor (since 1979).
Martin Fido, 79, British crime writer, fall.
Ken Hay, 85, American religious leader, founder of The Wilds Christian Association.
Bill Heine, 74, British radio broadcaster (BBC Radio Oxford), leukaemia.
Jón Helgason, 87, Icelandic politician, MP (1974–1995), Minister of Justice (1983–1987) and Agriculture (1987–1988).
Harry Judge, 90, English educational theorist.
Mahendran, 79, Indian film director (Mullum Malarum, Nenjathai Killathe, Kamaraj) and actor.
Jamshid Mashayekhi, 84, Iranian actor (Brick and Mirror, The Fateful Day, Abadan).
John Oddo, 66, American jazz pianist and music arranger.
Choidoryn Övgönkhüü, 76, Mongolian Olympic judoka (1972).
Roger Paris, French slalom canoeist.
Liliane Sprécher, 92, French Olympic athlete (1948).
Rosemarie Springer, 98, German Olympic equestrian (1960).
Sergio Valdés, 85, Chilean footballer (Universidad Católica, national team), leukaemia.
Franz Weber, 91, Swiss environmentalist.
Don Williamson, 85, American businessman (Brainerd International Raceway) and politician, mayor of Flint, Michigan (2003–2009), complications of respiratory illness.
Giuseppe Zorzi, 81, Italian racing cyclist.

3
Ferdinando Bologna, 93, Italian art critic.
Mary Borgstrom, 102, Canadian potter and ceramist.
Meyer Brownstone, 96, Canadian anti-poverty activist (Oxfam Canada).
Aleksey Buldakov, 68, Russian actor (The Guard, Peculiarities of the National Hunt, Hitler Goes Kaput!), blood clot.
Philip Furia, 75, American author.
Alina Kabata-Pendias, 89, Polish chemist and academic, specialist in biogeochemistry and soil science.
Guo Kun, 83, Chinese Antarctic explorer, director of the Great Wall Station and the Chinese Arctic and Antarctic Administration.
Daryl Hecht, 66, American judge, member of the Iowa Supreme Court (2006–2018), melanoma.
Einar Iversen, 88, Norwegian jazz pianist and composer.
Jacqueline Lichtenstein, 72, French philosopher and art historian.
Billy Mainwaring, 78, Welsh rugby union player (Aberavon, Bridgend, national team).
Gabriel Piroird, 86, French Roman Catholic prelate, Bishop of Constantine (1983–2008).
Maurice Pon, 97, French lyricist.
Carmelita Pope, 94, American actress (A Streetcar Named Desire).
W. Wesley Pue, 64, Canadian lawyer.
Shawn Smith, 53, American singer, songwriter and musician (Brad, Satchel, Pigeonhed), torn aorta and high blood pressure.
Jerzy Wójcik, 88, Polish cinematographer.

4
Cesare Cadeo, 72, Italian television presenter and journalist.
Alberto Cortez, 79, Argentine singer and songwriter, gastric haemorrhage.
Georgiy Daneliya, 88, Russian film director and screenwriter, People's Artist of the USSR (1989), acute respiratory and heart failure.
Đồng Sĩ Nguyên, 96, Vietnamese military officer and politician, Deputy Prime Minister (1982–1991).
Ray Harper, 91, New Zealand rugby union executive (Rugby Southland) and manager (national team), bone cancer.
Roberta Haynes, 91, American actress (Return to Paradise, High Noon, Gun Fury).
Mike Jakubo, 71, Canadian ice hockey player (Los Angeles Sharks, Fort Wayne Komets, Virginia Wings), complications from Alzheimer's disease.
Barry Malkin, 80, American film editor (The Godfather Part II, Big, Rumble Fish).
Thompson Mann, 76, American swimmer, Olympic champion (1964).
Marilyn Mason, 93, American concert organist and academic (University of Michigan).
Ivan Mrázek, 93, Czech Olympic basketball player (1948, 1952), European champion (1946) and coach.
Alessandro Pizzorno, 95, Italian sociologist.
Arthur Polonsky, 93, American painter.
Louis Rosenblum, 95, American research scientist and activist.
Shridhar Sathe, 68, Indian-born American food scientist.
Albin Siwak, 86, Polish politician.
Myer Skoog, 92, American basketball player (Minneapolis Lakers).
John Winneke, 81, Australian judge.

5
Anandavally, 67, Indian actress (Amba Ambika Ambalika, Sree Murukan, Swarna Gopuram) and voice actress.
Sydney Brenner, 92, South African biologist, Nobel Prize laureate (2002).
Julio Cotler, 86, Peruvian anthropologist.
Roger DeJordy, 81, Canadian ice hockey player (Hershey Bears).
Ib Glindemann, 84, Danish jazz composer and bandleader.
Herb Goldberg, 81, German-born American psychologist and author.
Nikolay Kovalyov, 69, Russian politician, Director of the Federal Security Service (1996–1998).
Nina Lagergren, 98, Swedish activist, co-founder of the Raoul Wallenberg Academy.
Gianfranco Leoncini, 79, Italian footballer (Juventus, Atalanta, national team), leukaemia.
Pastor López, 74, Venezuelan singer-songwriter, stroke.
Ly Tong, 73, Vietnamese-American anti-communist activist, lung failure.
Trevor McKee, 81, New Zealand Thoroughbred trainer (Sunline).
Samuel Pilafian, 69, American tuba player, colon cancer.
Lasse Pöysti, 92, Finnish actor.
John Quarmby, 89, English actor (Fawlty Towers, K-9 and Company, A Christmas Carol).
Keith Tate, 74, English boxer, stomach cancer.
Elriesa Theunissen-Fourie, 25, South African cricketer (national team), traffic collision.
Davey Williams, 66, American avant-garde guitarist (Curlew) and music critic (Birmingham News), cancer.
Wowaka, 31, Japanese Vocaloid producer and vocalist, heart failure.

6
Shirin Akiner, 75, Uzbek academic.
Romus Burgin, 96, American World War II veteran and author.
Paul J. Coleman, 87, American space scientist.
Jack Corrin, 87, Manx jurist and politician, First Deemster (1988–1998).
Louis Crump, 102, American politician, member of the Texas Senate (1959–1967).
Jim Glaser, 82, American country music artist ("You're Gettin' to Me Again"), heart attack.
Richard Green, 82, American sexologist and psychiatrist.
Fritz Hollings, 97, American politician, member of the U.S. Senate (1966–2005), Governor of South Carolina (1959–1963).
Lin Mingyu, 81, Chinese politician, Party Secretary of Haikou, Vice Chairman of Hainan People's Congress and CPPCC.
Olli Mäki, 82, Finnish boxer, European amateur champion (1959), complications from Alzheimer's disease.
Lloyd McDermott, 79, Australian rugby union player (national team), nation's first indigenous barrister.
Jean Namotte, 84, Belgian politician, Wallonia MP (1995–2004) and handball player.
Michael O'Donnell, 90, British physician, journalist, author and broadcaster.
Nadja Regin, 87, Serbian actress (From Russia with Love, Goldfinger, Runaway).
George Edward Rueger, 89, American Roman Catholic prelate, Auxiliary Bishop of Worcester (1987–2005).
Tele Samad, 74, Bangladeshi actor and comedian.
Ángel Sertucha, 88, Spanish footballer (Osasuna, Athletic Bilbao, Sabadell).
Mike Sheppard, 82, American baseball coach (Seton Hall Pirates).
Marshall M. Sloane, 92, American entrepreneur.
A. K. C. Sundaravel, 70, Indian politician, MLA (1991–1996), traffic collision.
David J. Thouless, 84, British physicist, Nobel Prize laureate (2016).

7
Peter Armstrong, 83, Australian rugby league player (St. George Dragons).
Claire Ball, 77, American politician, member of the Ohio House of Representatives (1973–1982).
Hugo Ballesteros Reyes, 88, Chilean politician, Senator (1969–1977) and Deputy (1957–1965), ambassador to the United Nations, brain cancer.
Joe Bertony, 97, French-born Australian spy and engineer.
Michael E. Busch, 72, American politician, Speaker (since 2003) and member of the Maryland House of Delegates (since 1987), pneumonia and nonalcoholic steatohepatitis.
Seymour Cassel, 84, American actor (Faces, The Royal Tenenbaums, Dick Tracy), complications from Alzheimer's disease.
Cho Yang-ho, 70, South Korean businessman (Korean Air, Hanjin).
John William Ditter Jr., 97, American jurist, Senior Judge of the United States District Court for the Eastern District of Pennsylvania (since 1986).
Arie Irawan, 28, Malaysian golfer.
Jean Paul Jacob, 81–82, Brazilian-American computer scientist.
Wilbert Keon, 83, Canadian heart surgeon and politician, Senator (1990–2010).
Víctor Manzanilla Schaffer, 94, Mexican politician and diplomat, Governor of Yucatán (1988–1991), Senator and Deputy, Ambassador to China and North Korea.
Willie McPheat, 76, Scottish footballer (Sunderland, Hartlepool United, Airdrieonians).
William B. Murray, 84, American opera baritone.
Mya-Lecia Naylor, 16, English actress (Millie Inbetween, Cloud Atlas), hanged by misadventure.
Neil D. Opdyke, 86, American geologist, heart failure.
Luis Fernando Páez, 29, Paraguayan footballer, traffic collision.
Sandy Ratcliff, 70, English actress (EastEnders).
Billy Rosen, 90, American bridge player, winner of the Bermuda Bowl (1954).
Ahmet Şenol, 93, Turkish Olympic wrestler (1948, 1952).
Lodune Sincaid, 45, American mixed martial artist (WEC, PFC, The Ultimate Fighter 1).
L. Eugene Smith, 97, American politician, member of the Pennsylvania House of Representatives (1963–1968, 1969–1986).
Al Staley, 90, Canadian ice hockey player (New York Rangers).
Jan Wraży, 75, Polish footballer (GKS Katowice, Valenciennes, national team).
Xiong Zhaoren, 107, Chinese major general.

8
Sheikh Abdul Aziz, Bangladeshi politician, Minister of Information (1973).
Blase Bonpane, 89, American human rights activist.
Clive Cohen, 73, English Anglican priest.
Robert Forguites, 80, American politician, member of the Vermont House of Representatives (since 2015).
Rex Garrod, 75, British roboteer (Brum, Robot Wars) and television presenter (The Secret Life of Machines), complications from Alzheimer's disease.
Leif Haraldseth, 89, Norwegian trade unionist and politician, Minister of Local Government (1986–1987).
Huang Yihe, 85, Chinese television director, created the CCTV New Year's Gala.
Navtej Hundal, Indian actor (Khalnayak, Tere Mere Sapne, Uri: The Surgical Strike).
Josine Ianco-Starrels, 92, Romanian-born American art curator.
Saad Jassim, 59, Iraqi footballer.
Vasily Likhachyov, 67, Russian politician.
Héctor del Mar, 76, Argentine-born Spanish professional wrestling commentator (WWE), heart attack.
Sir Alexander Reid, 3rd Baronet, 86, English aristocrat and public servant.
Gaston Rousseau, 93, French racing cyclist.
Roger Schofield, 82, British historian. 
Samuel "Bay" Taylor, 90, American baseball player (Kansas City Monarchs).
Turgeon, 33, French racehorse, Cartier Champion Stayer (1991).
Anzac Wallace, 76, New Zealand actor (Utu) and trade unionist, cancer.

9
Bob Beckett, 83, Canadian ice hockey player (Boston Bruins, Providence Reds).
Elwyn Berlekamp, 78, American mathematician.
Richard E. Cole, 103, American air force officer, last surviving member of the Doolittle Raid.
Pieter de Lange, 93, South African academic, chairman of the Afrikaner Broederbond (1984–1994).
Rod Galt, 67, Australian footballer (St Kilda, Carlton), stroke.
Nikolai Gorbachev, 70, Belarusian sprint canoeist, Olympic (1972) and world champion (1974).
Paul Hollander, 86, Hungarian-born American sociologist.
James D. Hudnall, 61, American comic book writer (Espers).
Bhima Mandavi, 40, Indian politician, MLA (since 2019), bombing.
K. M. Mani, 86, Indian politician, member of the Kerala Legislative Assembly (since 1965).
Robert Pennock, 82, Canadian politician.
Héctor Rivera Pérez, 85, Puerto Rican Roman Catholic prelate, Auxiliary Bishop of San Juan de Puerto Rico (1979–2009).
Marilynn Smith, 89, American Hall of Fame golfer, Titleholders champion (1963, 1964).
Charles Van Doren, 93, American academic, writer and television quiz contestant, part of the 1950s quiz show scandals.

10
Werner Bardenhewer, 90, German Roman Catholic priest and humanitarian, Dean of Wiesbaden (1974–1996).
Randall C. Berg Jr., 70, American attorney, Executive Director of the Florida Justice Institute (1978–2018), amyotrophic lateral sclerosis.
Drupad Borgohain, 77, Indian politician, MP (1998–2004), kidney disease.
Art Broback, 88, American politician, member of the Washington House of Representatives (1983–1985, 1991–1993).
Earl Thomas Conley, 77, American country music singer-songwriter ("Holding Her and Loving You"), cerebral atrophy.
Gilbert Dubier, 87, French Olympic wrestler (1960).
Tim Halliday, 73, British herpetologist.
Keith Harrison, 73, Canadian novelist.
Barbara Marx Hubbard, 89, American non-fiction writer.
Irwin L. Jacobs, 77, American investor (Genmar Holdings, Fishing League Worldwide, Watkins Incorporated), suicide by gunshot.
Raj Kumar Kapoor, 87, Indian actor (Hanste Zakhm, Dostana, Yeh Nazdeekiyan), producer (Oonche Log), director (Fauji).
Walter White, 67, American football player (Kansas City Chiefs), pancreatic cancer.
Estrella Zeledón Lizano, 89, Costa Rican politician, First Lady (1978–1982).

11
Thomas A. Abercrombie, 68, American writer, liver cancer.
Alexander V. Acebo, 91, American politician.
Don Arnott, 83, Zimbabwean cricketer.
Can Bartu, 83, Turkish basketball player (Fenerbahçe, national team) and footballer (national team).
Geoffrey Chew, 94, American theoretical physicist.
Ian Cognito, 60, British stand-up comedian, heart attack.
Lewis Cooper, 81, Australian cricketer.
Howard Copeland, 75, American politician, member of the Virginia House of Delegates (1981–1995), chordoma.
Vijay Dev, 78, Indian academic.
Dina, 62, Portuguese singer, pulmonary fibrosis.
Al Hester, 86, American author and academic.
Jorge Menéndez, 67, Uruguayan doctor and politician, Minister of Defence (2016–2019).
Monkey Punch, 81, Japanese manga artist (Lupin the Third), pneumonia.
Bill Nelsen, 78, American football player (Pittsburgh Steelers, Cleveland Browns).
Una-Mary Parker, 89, British journalist and novelist.
Stanley Plumly, 79, American poet, multiple myeloma.
Wayne Pomeroy, 96, American politician.
Scott Sanderson, 62, American baseball player (Chicago Cubs, Montreal Expos, Los Angeles Angels), agent and broadcaster, cancer.
Satan's Angel, 74, American exotic dancer, pneumonia.
Dmitri Savitski, 75, Russian writer and poet.
Peter Smedley, 76, Australian businessman, Chairman of Arrium.
Gary Stewart, 62, American music executive and archivist (Rhino Records, Apple Inc.).
Max van Weezel, 67, Dutch journalist, pancreatic cancer.

12
Ivor Broadis, 96, English footballer (Carlisle United, national team).
André Bureau, 83, Canadian lawyer and communications executive.
Italo Casali, 78, Sammarinese Olympic sports shooter (1972, 1976).
Alajdin Demiri, 64, Albanian politician.
Georgia Engel, 70, American actress (The Mary Tyler Moore Show, Open Season, Everybody Loves Raymond).
Forrest Gregg, 85, American Hall of Fame football player (Green Bay Packers) and coach (Cincinnati Bengals, Cleveland Browns), complications from Parkinson's disease.
Ronald Paul Herzog, 76, American Roman Catholic prelate, Bishop of Alexandria (2005–2017).
Ric Holt, 78, Canadian computer scientist.
Robert F. Inger, 98, American herpetologist.
John McEnery, 75, British actor (Romeo and Juliet, Nicholas and Alexandra, The Land That Time Forgot).
Norrie Muir, 70, Scottish mountaineer.
Lindsay Parsons, 73, English football player (Bristol Rovers, Torquay United) and coach (Stoke City).
Paul Rawlinson, 56, British lawyer, head of Baker McKenzie (since 2016).
Tommy Smith, 74, English footballer (Liverpool, national team), dementia.
Carol Thomas, South African gynecologist.

13
Francisca Aguirre, 88, Spanish poet, Premio Nacional de las Letras Españolas winner (2018).
Donald Ault, 76, American literary scholar.
Ron Austin, 90, Australian LGBT rights activist.
D. Babu Paul, 78, Indian civil servant, multiple organ failure.
Rodolfo Francisco Bobadilla Mata, 86, Guatemalan Roman Catholic prelate, Bishop of Huehuetenango (1996–2012).
Tony Buzan, 76, English author and educational consultant.
Wally Carr, 64, Australian boxer, cancer.
Neus Català, 103, Spanish Resistance fighter, Holocaust survivor and political activist.
Mark Connolly, 63, American politician, brain hemorrhage.
Michael Coper, 72, Australian legal scholar (Australian National University).
Quentin Fiore, 99, American graphic designer.
S. Thomas Gagliano, 87, American politician, member of the New Jersey Senate (1978–1989).
Norman Garwood, 73, English production designer.
Paul Greengard, 93, American neuroscientist, Nobel Prize laureate (2000).
Kwame Gyekye, 79, Ghanaian philosopher.
Marsha Hanen, 82, Canadian academic, Vice Chancellor of the University of Winnipeg (1989–1999), non-Hodgkin's lymphoma.
Winifred Jordan, 99, British Olympic sprinter (1948).
Norio Kaifu, 75, Japanese astronomer, director-general of the National Astronomical Observatory (2000–2006), president of the IAU (2012–2015), pancreatic cancer.
Bamapada Mukherjee, 97, Indian politician.
Billy Myers, 95, Canadian football player (Toronto Argonauts).
Mamman Nasir, 89, Nigerian judge, President of the courts of appeals (1978–1992).
Anne Patrizio, British LGBT rights activist.
Paul Raymond, 73, English keyboardist and guitarist (Plastic Penny, UFO, Savoy Brown), heart attack.
J. K. Rithesh, 46, Indian actor and politician, heart attack.
S. K. Shivakumar, 66, Indian space scientist, complications from jaundice.
Ján Starší, 85, Slovak ice hockey player and coach.
LeRoy Washburn, 84, Canadian politician, member of the Legislative Assembly of New Brunswick (1974–1982).
Lydia Wideman, 98, Finnish cross-country skier, Olympic champion (1952).
Yvette Williams, 89, New Zealand Hall of Fame athlete, Olympic (1952) and Commonwealth (1950, 1954) champion.

14
Bibi Andersson, 83, Swedish actress (The Seventh Seal, Wild Strawberries, Persona), complications from a stroke.
Giuseppe Ciarrapico, 85, Italian politician and football executive, Senator (2008–2013) and President of A.S. Roma (1991–1993).
Colin Collindridge, 98, English footballer (Sheffield United, Nottingham Forest).
David Brion Davis, 92, American historian.
Elma Davis, 51, South African lawn bowler, shot.
Denis Dupéré, 70, Canadian ice hockey player (Toronto Maple Leafs, Washington Capitals, St. Louis Blues).
Nand Lal, 74, Indian politician.
Abdallah Lamrani, 72–73, Moroccan footballer (FAR Rabat, national team), Olympics (1972).
Anne Lewis, 56, American lawyer, cancer.
John MacLeod, 81, American basketball coach (Phoenix Suns, Notre Dame), complications from Alzheimer's disease.
Mirjana Marković, 76, Serbian politician and fugitive from justice, pneumonia.
Hessel Miedema, 90, Dutch art historian.
Dmitri Nabokov, 42, Russian ice hockey player (Krylya Sovetov Moscow, Chicago Blackhawks, New York Islanders).
Jacek Namieśnik, 69, Polish chemist, rector of Gdańsk University of Technology.
Gene Wolfe, 87, American science fiction (The Book of the New Sun) and fantasy writer (Soldier of Sidon), Nebula (1974, 1981) and multi-Locus Award winner, heart disease.

15
Warren Adler, 91, American author (The War of the Roses, Random Hearts), liver cancer.
Gustavo Arias Murueta, 95, Mexican painter, sculptor and poet.
Jerry Clack, 92, American classics scholar.
Marcelo Dascal, 78, Brazilian-born Israeli philosopher and linguist.
Owen Garriott, 88, American astronaut (Skylab 3).
Sithembile Gumbo, 56, Zimbabwean politician, MP for Lupane, traffic collision.
Rex Harry, 82, Australian cricketer (Victoria).
Lloyd James, 82, Bermudian cricketer.
Louise H. Kellogg, 59, American geophysicist.
Aleksandar Kostov, 81, Bulgarian football player (Levski Sofia, national team) and coach (AS Marsa).
Malky McCormick, 76, Scottish cartoonist, vascular dementia.
Sir Roger Moate, 80, British politician, MP (1970–1997), cancer.
Don Perry, 89, Canadian ice hockey player (New Haven Blades) and coach (Los Angeles Kings).
Quinzinho, 45, Angolan footballer (Alverca, Xiamen Lanshi, national team), heart attack.
Elaine Rapp, 91, American sculptor.
Les Reed, 83, English songwriter ("It's Not Unusual", "Delilah", "The Last Waltz").
José María Rico, 84, Costa Rican lawyer, First Gentleman (2010–2014), complications from Alzheimer's disease.
P. N. Shankar, 74, Indian fluid dynamicist.
Winston L. Shelton, 96, American inventor and entrepreneur.
Noel Starblanket, 72, Canadian politician, chief of the National Indian Brotherhood (1976–1980).

16
Vladimir Boltyansky, 93, Russian mathematician.
Ricardo Chibanga, 76, Mozambican bullfighter.
Francis Croissant, 83–84, French archaeologist and art historian.
Jörg Demus, 90, Austrian pianist.
Dale Denno, 68, American politician, member of the Maine House of Representatives (2016–2019), lung cancer.
Ahmad Eghtedari, 93–94, Iranian teacher, lawyer and writer, complications from lung and kidney deficiencies.
Guro Fjellanger, 55, Norwegian politician, Minister of the Environment (1997–2000).
Jose Mari Gonzales, 80, Filipino actor and politician, pneumonia.
Kent Harris, 88, American songwriter ("Shoppin' for Clothes") and record producer, cancer.
Len Hoogerbrug, 89, Dutch-born New Zealand architect.
Kiyoshi Kawakubo, 89, Japanese voice actor (Gurren Lagann, Bubblegum Crisis).
Bill LeCaine, 81, Canadian ice hockey player (Pittsburgh Penguins).
Abraham D. Mattam, 96, Indian Syro-Malabar Catholic hierarch, Bishop of Satna (1968–1999).
Fay McKenzie, 101, American actress (Down Mexico Way, Heart of the Rio Grande, Breakfast at Tiffany's).
Ignace Murwanashyaka, 55, Rwandan militant, leader of the Democratic Forces for the Liberation of Rwanda.
Bazilije Pandžić, 101, Croatian historian, archivist and orientalist.
Pete Peterson, 89, American baseball player and general manager (Pittsburgh Pirates).
Valentin Plătăreanu, 82, Romanian actor and director.
Juan Francisco Rodríguez, 68, Spanish European bantamweight champion boxer (1978).
Suzanne Twelftree, 62, Australian Paralympic wheelchair tennis player and powerlifter (1992, 2000).
Xia Suisheng, 94, Chinese surgeon, pioneer in organ transplantation.
Mountaineers killed in the Howse Peak avalanche:
Hansjörg Auer, 35, Austrian.
David Lama, 28, Austrian.
Jess Roskelley, 36, American.

17
Tony Bird, 74, Malawian-born South African singer-songwriter.
Peter Cartwright, 78, New Zealand lawyer, viceregal consort (2001–2006).
Chet Coppock, 70, American broadcast journalist (WMAQ, WSNS-TV) and sports talk personality (Sporting News Radio), traffic collision.
George Finkel, 82, American TV sports producer and director.
Alan García, 69, Peruvian sociologist and politician, President (1985–1990, 2006–2011), suicide by gunshot.
Frederick Hemke, 83, American saxophonist.
Ryszard Kaja, 57, Polish graphic artist.
Norman Jacobsen, 89, Canadian politician.
Kazuo Koike, 82, Japanese manga artist (Lone Wolf and Cub, Lady Snowblood), pneumonia.
Timothy Lawson-Cruttenden, 64, British solicitor.
Ya'akov Nehoshtan, 93, Israeli politician and diplomat, member of the Knesset (1969–1974), ambassador to the Netherlands (1982–1985).
Folagbade Olateru Olagbegi III, 77, Nigerian ruler, Olowo of Owo (since 1999).
Sir Clive Rose, 97, British diplomat.
James V. Schall, 91, American Jesuit Roman Catholic priest, teacher and writer.
Pieter Verhoeff, 81, Dutch film director (The Dream, The Sunday Child, The Moving True Story of a Woman Ahead of Her Time).
Alex Weil, 67, American filmmaker (One Rat Short).

18
John Bowen, 94, British novelist and dramatist.
Ken Buehler, 99, American basketball player (Sheboygan Red Skins, Fort Wayne Zollner Pistons).
Con de Lange, 38, South African-born Scottish cricketer (Northamptonshire, national team), brain tumour.
Ivo Frosio, 89, Swiss footballer (Grasshoppers, Lugano, national team).
Samuel H. Gruber, 80, American marine biologist.
Jamil Jalibi, 89, Pakistani linguist, writer and academic administrator, vice-chancellor of the University of Karachi (1983–1987).
H. M. Jayawardena, 69, Sri Lankan composer and musician.
Andrew Mallard, 56, British-born Australian ex-prisoner, wrongfully convicted of murder, hit-and-run.
Lyra McKee, 29, Northern Irish journalist, shot.
Don Melnick, 65, American biologist and conservationist.
Hasibul Islam Mizan, 62, Bangladeshi film director.
Ira Neimark, 97, American retail executive (Bergdorf Goodman).
Kate Nicholson, 89, English painter. 
Jennifer Phipps, 87, Canadian actress.
Iča Putrih, 77, Slovene comedian.
Eddie Tigner, 92, American blues keyboardist, singer and songwriter.
Andreas Ugland, 93, Norwegian ship's engineer.
Willem Hendrik Velema, 89, Dutch theologian.
Lorraine Warren, 92, American paranormal investigator and author, subject of The Conjuring.
Siegmar Wätzlich, 71, German footballer (Dynamo Dresden, East Germany national team), Olympic bronze medalist (1972).
Zheng Guo'en, 89, Chinese filmmaker and educator.

19
Martin Böttcher, 91, German composer, arranger and conductor.
Chitrabhanu, 96, Indian religious leader.
Zora Dirnbach, 89, Croatian journalist and writer.
Renald Knysh, 87, Belarusian artistic gymnastics coach.
William Krehm, 105, Canadian Trotskyist activist and Spanish Civil War veteran.
Philip Liner, 93, British-born New Zealand radio broadcaster (National Radio).
MC Sapão, 40, Brazilian singer-songwriter, pneumonia.
Michael Lyons, 75, British sculptor.
Massimo Marino, 59, Italian television presenter and actor.
Roy Mugerwa, 77, Ugandan physician.
Yuriy Pimenov, 61, Russian rower, Olympic silver medalist (1980).
Francis Sanziri, 62, Ghanaian military officer, heart attack.
Patrick Sercu, 74, Belgian cyclist, Olympic champion (1964).
Rodolfo Severino Jr., 82, Filipino diplomat, Secretary-General of the ASEAN (1998–2002), ambassador to Malaysia (1989–1992), complications from Parkinson's disease.
Peter Stoddart, 84, English cricketer (Marylebone Cricket Club).
Kawaski Trawick, 32, African American trainer and dancer.
Verena Wagner Lafferentz, 98, German Wagner family member.
Xiao Yang, 80, Chinese judge, President of the Supreme People's Court (1998–2008), Minister of Justice (1993–1998).
Okiharu Yasuoka, 79, Japanese politician, Minister of Justice (2000, 2008), pancreatic cancer.
Michael Yorke, 80, British Anglican priest, Dean of Lichfield (1999–2005).

20
Bed Prakash Agarwal, 83, Indian politician, Odisha MLA (1974–1980, 1990–1995, 2000–2004, since 2009).
Enrico Alberto, 85, French-Italian footballer.
Rolf Amrein, 89, Swiss Olympic sailor (1968, 1972).
Joe Armstrong, 68, British computer scientist, designer of Erlang.
Jarosław Biernat, 58, Polish footballer (Eintracht Frankfurt, SG Union Solingen, SpVgg Bayreuth).
Luděk Bukač, 83, Czech ice hockey player and manager (Sparta Praha).
Reggie Cobb, 50, American football player (Tampa Bay Buccaneers, Green Bay Packers, New York Jets), heart attack.
Peter Colotka, 94, Slovak academic, lawyer and politician, Prime Minister of the Slovak Socialist Republic (1969–1988).
Terence Dolan, 76, Irish lexicographer.
Joyce Evans, 89, Australian photographer.
Bazlul Karim Falu, 68, Bangladeshi politician.
Monir Shahroudy Farmanfarmaian, 96, Iranian artist.
Ernie Fischer, 88, American Olympic wrestler (1956).
Karl Grob, 72, Swiss footballer (Zürich, national team), heart failure.
Charlie Kelsall, 98, Welsh footballer.
Galina Kmit, 87, Russian photographer.
Braulio Lara, 30, Dominican baseball player (SK Wyverns), traffic collision.
Kiyonomori Masao, 84, Japanese sumo wrestler, pneumonia.
Pedro Matrona, 91, Curaçaoan Olympic footballer (1952).
S. Muthiah, 89, Indian historian.
Amar Pal, 96, Indian folk singer, heart attack.
David V. Picker, 87, American film executive (United Artists, Paramount Pictures) and producer (The Jerk), complications from colon cancer.
Mavis Pusey, 90, Jamaican-born American abstract artist.
Jacqueline Saburido, 40, Venezuelan-American anti-drunk driving campaigner, cancer.
Phil Solomon, 65, American experimental filmmaker, complications following surgery.
Doreen Spooner, 91, British photographer.
Atli Heimir Sveinsson, 80, Icelandic composer.
Pranita Talukdar, 83–84, Indian academic, politician, social worker, Assam Legislative Assembly (1967–1978).
Valdiram, 36, Brazilian footballer (CR Vasco da Gama), beaten.
John Whitworth, 74, British poet.
Jayne Wrightsman, 99, American philanthropist and fine arts collector.
Wu Yili, 87–88, Chinese-Singaporean pianist.
David Zafer, 85, British-born Canadian violinist.

21
Suzanne Carrell, 96, French-born American educator.
Hannelore Elsner, 76, German actress (Student of the Bedroom, The Black Forest Clinic, Die Kommissarin), cancer.
Violeta Gindeva, 72, Bulgarian actress and academic (Plovdiv University "Paisii Hilendarski").
Steve Golin, 64, American film producer (Spotlight, Eternal Sunshine of the Spotless Mind, The Revenant), Oscar winner (2016), cancer.
Duncan Green, 93, British military officer.
David A. Hamburg, 93, American psychiatrist, ischemic colitis.
Aminul Haque, 76, Bangladeshi politician, MP (1991–2006), Minister of Posts and Telecommunications (2001–2006), liver cancer.
Heidi Hetzer, 81, German entrepreneur and world tour rally driver.
Polly Higgins, 50, Scottish environmentalist, cancer.
Sigurður Jónsson, 96, Icelandic Olympic swimmer (1948).
Horst Kassner, 81, German motorcycle road racer.
Ken Kercheval, 83, American actor (Dallas, Network, The Seven-Ups), pneumonia.
Shantha Mayadunne, Sri Lankan chef, bombing.
Abu Saleh Mohammad Saeed, 73, Bangladeshi politician.
Shivlal Sharma, 80, Indian politician, MLA (1985–1990), cardiac arrest.
Joyce Steele, 83, American baseball player (Kalamazoo Lassies).
Amelia Vargas, 91, Cuban actress (Arroz con Leche, The Phantom of the Operetta, Cleopatra Was Candida) and dancer.
John Wells-Thorpe, 90, English architect, Parkinson's disease.
Frances Winfield, 77, American author.

22
Patricia Battin, 89, American librarian.
Krasimir Bezinski, 57, Bulgarian footballer (CSKA Sofia, Portimonense, national team), colorectal cancer.
Robert L. Butler, 92, American lawyer and politician, Mayor of Marion, Illinois (1963–2018).
Deborah Cook, 80, American operatic soprano, Alzheimer's disease.
Jim Dunbar, 89, American radio program director (KGO).
Heather Harper, 88, Northern Irish soprano, Grammy winner (1980, 1985).
Huang Zhanyue, 92, Chinese archaeologist (Mausoleum of the Nanyue King).
Stanisław Jędryka, 85, Polish film director (The Impossible Goodbye).
Simon Kaipuram, 65, Indian Roman Catholic prelate, Bishop of Balasore (since 2013).
Ventseslav Konstantinov, 78, Bulgarian writer, aphorist and translator.
John L'Heureux, 84, American author, complications from Parkinson's disease.
Lê Đức Anh, 98, Vietnamese military officer and politician, Chief of the General Staff (1986–1987), Minister of Defence (1987–1992) and President (1992–1997), complications from a stroke.
William Levy, 80, American writer.
Billy McNeill, 79, Scottish football player (Celtic, national team) and manager (Aberdeen), dementia.
Andy O'Donnell, 94, American basketball player.
John Quinn, 78, Canadian professional wrestler (NWA, WWWF).
Dave Samuels, 70, American percussionist (Spyro Gyra).
Greg Theakston, 65, American comics artist (Mad).
František Xaver Thuri, 79, Czech composer.
Oiva Toikka, 87, Finnish glass designer.
Julio César Toresani, 51, Argentine football player (River Plate, Boca Juniors) and manager (Colón), suicide by hanging.

23
László Balogh, 61, Hungarian Olympic sport shooter, traffic collision.
Henry W. Bloch, 96, American businessman and philanthropist, co-founder of H&R Block.
Edward Brooks, 76, American politician, member of the Wisconsin State Assembly (2009–2018), leukemia.
Matthew Buckland, 44, South African internet entrepreneur and businessman, cancer.
Wendelin Enders, 96, German politician, MP (1967–1987).
Mario Fabbrocino, 76, Italian mobster.
Fermo Favini, 83, Italian football player and executive.
Viggo Fossum, 69, Norwegian politician.
Della Godfrey, Indian politician, MLA (1994–2004).
Charles Gheerbrant, 94, French politician, Deputy (1993–1997), Mayor of Saint-Nicolas (1973–2001).
Max Golser, 78, Austrian Olympic ski jumper (1968, 1972).
George Haigh, 103, English footballer (Stockport County).
Jean, 98, Luxembourgish royal, Grand Duke (1964–2000), pulmonary infection.
Edward Kelsey, 88, English actor (The Archers, Danger Mouse, Wallace & Gromit: The Curse of the Were-Rabbit).
Denton Lotz, 80, American Baptist minister, Secretary of the Baptist World Alliance (1988–2007).
Mark Medoff, 79, American playwright (When You Comin' Back, Red Ryder?, Children of a Lesser God) and screenwriter, Tony winner (1980), complications from a fall.
Voja Mirić, 86, Serbian actor (Death and the Dervish).
Juan José Muñante, 70, Peruvian footballer (Universitario, Pumas, national team), lung cancer.
Johnny Neumann, 68, American basketball player (Memphis Tams, Virginia Squires, Los Angeles Lakers), cancer.
Nils John Nilsson, 86, American computer scientist.
Tadeusz Pluciński, 92, Polish actor (Westerplatte, Stawka większa niż życie, Czterdziestolatek).
Lorenzo Quinteros, 73, Argentine actor (Man Facing Southeast, A Wall of Silence, Valentín).
Pablo Ramirez, 26, American skateboarder, traffic collision.
Terry Rawlings, 85, British film editor (Alien, Blade Runner, Chariots of Fire), heart failure.
José Rizo Castellón, 74, Nicaraguan politician, economist and lawyer, Vice President (2002–2005).
Jotindra Nath Roy, 84, Indian politician, MLA (1991-2006).
Peter Skipper, 61, English footballer (Hull City), complications from a stroke.
Scott W. Sloan, 64, Australian civil engineer and academic.
John Shorter Stevens, 85, American politician, member of the North Carolina House of Representatives (1969–1976).
Charity Sunshine Tillemann-Dick, 35, American soprano and presenter, idiopathic pulmonary hypertension.
Alan G. Thomas, 92, British materials scientist.
David Winters, 80, English-American actor and choreographer (West Side Story).
Johan Witteveen, 97, Dutch politician and economist, Deputy Prime Minister (1967–1971), Managing Director of the IMF (1973–1978).

24
Saleh Ahmed, 83, Bangladeshi actor (Srabon Megher Din, Aguner Poroshmoni).
Chris Albertson, 87, American journalist, writer, and record producer.
Françoise Barrière, 76, French composer.
Benson K. Buffham, 99, American intelligence official, Deputy Director of the National Security Agency (1974–1978).
Johnny Green, 81, American football player (Buffalo Bills, New York Jets, Toronto Argonauts).
Hubert Hahne, 84, German racing driver, dementia.
Martin Kilson, 88, American political scientist.
Francisco Lerma Martínez, 74, Spanish-born Mozambican Roman Catholic prelate, Bishop of Gurué (since 2010).
Abbassi Madani, 88, Algerian Islamic militant and politician, President of the Islamic Salvation Front (1989–1992).
Jean-Pierre Marielle, 87, French actor (Cookies, Without Apparent Motive, The Da Vinci Code).
Zoran Marojević, 76, Serbian basketball player, Olympic silver medalist (1968).
Sergey Pogorelov, 44, Russian handball player, Olympic champion (2000).
Feargal Quinn, 82, Irish businessman and politician, founder of Superquinn, Senator (1993–2016).
Dick Rivers, 74, French rock and roll singer (Les Chats Sauvages), cancer.
Conrado San Martín, 98, Spanish actor (The Princess of the Ursines, The Colossus of Rhodes, Riders of the Dawn).
John Simpson, 85, English Anglican priest, Dean of Canterbury (1986–2000).
Dennis Stanford, 76, American archaeologist.
Babill Stray-Pedersen, 76, Norwegian physician.
Michael Wolf, 64, German photographer.

25
Vidya Sagar Chaudhary, 85, Indian politician.
Josip Ćuk, 83, Yugoslav Olympic sports shooter.
Michiro Endo, 68, Japanese musician (The Stalin), pancreatic cancer.
Povl Falk-Jensen, 98, Danish resistance member during World War II.
Alberto Giovannini, 63–64, Italian economist.
Gregory Gray, 59, Northern Irish singer-songwriter (Rosetta Stone).
Robbert de Greef, 27, Dutch road racing cyclist, heart attack.
Svante Grundberg, 75, Swedish actor and comedian (Sällskapsresan, Göta kanal eller Vem drog ur proppen?).
John Havlicek, 79, American Hall of Fame basketball player (Boston Celtics), complications from Parkinson's disease.
Kurohimeyama Hideo, 70, Japanese sumo wrestler, pneumonia.
Larry "Flash" Jenkins, 63, American actor (Ferris Bueller's Day Off, Fletch, The White Shadow), heart attack.
Dirceu Krüger, 74, Brazilian footballer (Coritiba), heart attack.
Michael Lavery, 84, Northern Irish barrister.
Manuel Lujan Jr., 90, American politician, Secretary of the Interior (1989–1993), member of the U.S. House of Representatives (1969–1989).
Faty Papy, 28, Burundian footballer (MVV Maastricht, Bidvest Wits, national team), heart attack.
Sir Nigel Seely, 95, English aristocrat.
Morton Sosland, 93, American businessman.
Paloma Tortajada, 49, Spanish broadcaster and journalist.
Peter Vander Pyl, 85, Canadian Olympic hockey player (1964).

26
Abdul-Latif Arabiyat, 86, Jordanian politician, Speaker of the House of Representatives (1990–1993).
Jimmy Banks, 54, American soccer player (Milwaukee Wave, national team) and coach (Milwaukee School of Engineering), pancreatic cancer.
Elina Bystritskaya, 91, Russian actress (Unfinished Story, And Quiet Flows the Don, All Remains to People), People's Artist of the USSR (1978).
Zé do Carmo, 85, Brazilian ceramist, heart attack.
Nasser Farbod, 96, Iranian political activist and military officer, Chief of Staff (1979).
Jessie Lawrence Ferguson, 76, American actor (Prince of Darkness, Darkman, Boyz n the Hood).
Nancy Fouts, 74, American artist.
Fu Xinqi, 100, Chinese architect, academic, and painter.
Anthony J. Hilder, 84, American surf music producer, radio host and conspiracy film maker.
Eric Kent, 99, Australian politician, member of the Victorian Legislative Council (1970–1976, 1979–1985).
Anil Kumar Koneru, Indian film producer (Sriramachandrulu, Radha Gopalam, Allari Bullodu), cancer.
Frederick Niels Larsen, 87, American religious leader, President of the Remnant Church of Jesus Christ of Latter Day Saints.
Colette Lorand, 96, Swiss opera singer.
Sir David McNee, 94, Scottish police officer, Commissioner of the Metropolitan Police (1977–1982).
Petar Omčikus, 92, Serbian painter.
Steven Paul, 64, British Olympic fencer (1980, 1984, 1992) and stuntman (Die Another Day), fall.
Ken Rothman, 83, American politician, Lt. Governor of Missouri (1981–1985), member (1963–1981) and Speaker of the Missouri House of Representatives (1977–1981).
Mae Schmidle, 91, American politician, member of the Connecticut House of Representatives (1981–1991).
Ellen Schwiers, 88, German actress (When the Bells Sound Clearly, The Inheritance of Bjorndal, God's Thunder).
Reijo Taipale, 79, Finnish singer, dementia.
C. K. Tedam, 93, Ghanaian teacher and politician.

27
Adrian Brown, 89, British stage and television director and producer (Top Secret, No Hiding Place, Emergency – Ward 10).
Bart Chilton, 58, American civil servant, Commissioner of the Commodity Futures Trading Commission (2007–2014), pancreatic cancer.
Edward Fraenkel, 91, German-born British mathematician.
Teva Harrison, 42, Canadian-American writer and cartoonist, breast cancer.
Dan LaRose, 80, American football player (Detroit Lions).
Gerald James Larson, 81, American indologist.
Aleksey Lebed, 64, Russian military officer and politician, Head of the Republic of Khakassia (1997–2009), internal bleeding.
Ruth Macrides, 69, American historian.
Jack de Mello, 102, American composer.
Jerzy Moes, 83, Polish actor.
María de los Ángeles Moreno, 74, Mexican politician, Secretary of Fisheries (1988–1991).
Negasso Gidada, 75, Ethiopian politician, President (1995–2001).
Jón Karl Sigurðsson, 87, Icelandic Olympic alpine skier (1952).
Vasanthi Stanley, 56, Indian politician, MP (2008–2014).
Gene Stephens, 86, American baseball player (Boston Red Sox).
Mahfuz Ullah, 69, Bangladeshi journalist and environmentalist, heart and lung failure.
Joseph Ward, 76, English tenor.
Joe T. Wood, 96, American politician, member of the Georgia House of Representatives (1966–1989).

28
Anisur Rahman Anis, 78, Bangladeshi actor.
William S. Banowsky, 83, American preacher and academic, President of Pepperdine University (1971–1978) and the University of Oklahoma (1978–1984).
Bruce Bickford, 72, American animator (Baby Snakes, The Dub Room Special, The Amazing Mr. Bickford).
Caroline Bittencourt, 37, Brazilian model, drowned. 
Sylvia Bretschneider, 58, German politician, member of the Landtag of Mecklenburg-Vorpommern (since 1994), cancer.
Wayson Choy, 80, Canadian writer (The Jade Peony, All That Matters).
Dan Conners, 78, American football player (Oakland Raiders).
Dax Cowart, 71, American attorney, complications from leukemia and liver cancer.
Lothar Geisler, 82, German footballer (VfL Bochum, Borussia Dortmund).
Zaki al-Ghul, 92–93, Palestinian politician.
Daniel Horlaville, 73, French footballer (Paris, Rouen, national team).
Thomas Jessell, 67, American biochemist, neurodegenerative disease.
Damon Keith, 96, American judge, member of the U.S. Court of Appeals for the Sixth Circuit (since 1977), complications from leukemia and cardiovascular disease.
Barry Latman, 82, American baseball player (Chicago White Sox, Cleveland Indians, Houston Astros).
Jo Sullivan Loesser, 91, American actress (The Most Happy Fella), heart failure.
Richard Lugar, 87, American politician, U.S. Senator (1977–2013), mayor of Indianapolis (1968–1976), complications from CIDP.
Karol Modzelewski, 81, Polish historian, writer, politician and academic.
Genrikh Novozhilov, 93, Soviet and Russian aircraft designer.
Maurício Peixoto, 98, Brazilian engineer and mathematician.
Alejandro Planchart, 83, Venezuelan-born American musicologist.
Otto Rogers, 83, Canadian painter.
Bernt Rougthvedt, 62, Norwegian historian and crime writer, cancer.
John Singleton, 51, American film director and television producer (Boyz n the Hood, 2 Fast 2 Furious, Snowfall), stroke.
Sir William Slack, 94, British surgeon.
Jah Stitch, 69, Jamaican reggae singer.
Menachem Mendel Taub, 96, Israeli Hasidic rebbe and Holocaust survivor.

29
Carlo Maria Abate, 86, Italian auto racing driver.
Lee K. Abbott, 71, American writer, cancer.
Doug Adair, 89, American television news anchor (WKYC, WCMH).
Eldon Bargewell, 71, American army general, commander of Delta Force, lawnmower rollover.
Stevie Chalmers, 83, Scottish footballer (Celtic, national team).
Albert-Marie de Monléon, 82, French Roman Catholic prelate, Bishop of Pamiers (1988–1999) and Meaux (1999–2012).
René Dybkær, 93, Danish Olympic fencer (1948, 1952).
Tom Ellis, 86, American journalist and television news anchor (WBZ-TV, WCVB-TV, New England Cable News), cancer.
Franklin M. Fisher, 84, American economist.
George W. Homsey, 93, American architect.
Vijaykumar Khandre, 60, Indian politician, MLA (1989–1999), cardiac arrest.
Jamsrangiin Ölzii-Orshikh, 52, Mongolian Olympic racing cyclist (1992).
Grigori F. Krivosheev, 89, Russian military historian.
Wojciech Królikowski, 92, Polish physicist.
Donald Lan, 88, American politician, Secretary of State of New Jersey (1977–1982).
George Litto, 88, American film producer and talent agent, complications from aortic stenosis.
Betty Lockwood, Baroness Lockwood, 95, British political activist and life peer, Member of the House of Lords (1978–2017).
Gino Marchetti, 93, American Hall of Fame football player (Baltimore Colts), pneumonia.
John Llewellyn Moxey, 94, British film director (The City of the Dead, Foxhole in Cairo, Circus of Fear).
Les Murray, 80, Australian poet.
José Rodrigues Neto, 69, Brazilian footballer (Flamengo, Ferro Carril Oeste, national team), thrombosis.
Makoto Ogino, 59, Japanese manga artist (Spirit Warrior), kidney failure.
Su Yu-chang, 78, Chinese martial artist, scholar and physician.
Josef Šural, 28, Czech footballer (Slovan Liberec, Sparta Prague, national team), traffic collision.
Ellen Tauscher, 67, American politician, Under Secretary for Arms Control and International Security Affairs (2009–2012), member of the U.S. House of Representatives (1997–2009), complications from pneumonia.
James D. Wright, 71, American sociologist.
Nelliy Yefremova, 57, Russian canoeist.
Werner Zimmer, 89, German Olympic wrestler.

30
Anémone, 68, French actress (Santa Claus Is a Stinker, The Grand Highway), César winner (1988), lung cancer.
Silvina Bosco, 52, Argentine actress, cancer.
Beth Carvalho, 72, Brazilian samba singer (Estação Primeira de Mangueira).
Chuck Cecil, 96, American broadcaster.
Luciano Comaschi, 87, Italian football player (Brescia, Napoli) and manager.
Dunaden, 13, French racehorse, Melbourne Cup winner (2011), complications of a paddock accident.
Max Evans, 88, Australian politician.
Ahmed Fagih, 76, Libyan writer.
Russ Gibb, 87, American music promoter (MC5, Ted Nugent, Iggy Pop), heart failure.
Fitzroy Gordon, 65, Jamaican-born Canadian radio broadcaster (CKFG-FM).
Boon Gould, 64, English musician (Level 42).
Nurit Karlin, 80, Israeli cartoonist.
Art Kunkin, 91, American journalist.
Luis Maldonado Venegas, 62, Mexican politician, Deputy (2015–2018).
Peter Mayhew, 74, English-American actor (Star Wars), heart attack.
S. P. Y. Reddy, 68, Indian politician, MP (since 2004), lung infection.
Robert R. Spitzer, 96, American agricultural researcher and educator.
Joseph D. Stewart, 77, American military officer, melanoma.
Erika Strasser, 85, Austrian Olympic javelin thrower.

References

2019-04
 04